Thomas Dürst (born 22 June 1967) is a former German cyclist. He competed in two events at the 1988 Summer Olympics.

References

External links
 

1967 births
Living people
German male cyclists
Olympic cyclists of West Germany
Cyclists at the 1988 Summer Olympics
Cyclists from Munich